Dream Team may refer to:

Sport

Basketball
 Dream Team, the 1992 United States men's Olympic basketball team in Barcelona
 Dream Team II, the 1994 U.S. men's national basketball team at the FIBA World Championship
 Dream Team III, the 1996 U.S. men's Olympic basketball team in Atlanta

Football
 FIFA World Cup Dream Team, an all-time all-star theoretical football team published by FIFA after a poll in 2004

Miscellaneous
 AFL Dream Team, an online fantasy football competition for supporters run by the Australian Football League
 An Australian rules football team called the "Dream Team" represented the States and territories of Australia outside Victoria in the AFL Hall of Fame Tribute Match
 Super League Dream Team, award for players in the European rugby Super League

Arts, entertainment, and media

Films
 The Dream Team (1989 film), a 1989 American comedy film
 Dream Team (1999 film), a 1999 gay pornographic film, produced by Studio 2000
 The Dream Team (2012 film), a 2012 French film
La Dream Team (2016 film), a Thomas Sorriaux French film

Music
 Dreamteam, South African hip hop musical group
 LA Dream Team, American hip-hop act
The Dream Team (Jimmy McGriff album), 1997

Television

Series and programming blocks
 Dream Team (TV series), a British television series
 CBS Dream Team, a children's television programming block on CBS
 Let's Go! Dream Team Season 2, a Korean television series

Episodes
 "Dream Team" (The Office), an episode of the American television series The Office
 "The Dream Team" (Entourage episode), an episode of Entourage

Other uses
 Dream Team, a trio of Minecraft YouTubers consisting of Dream, Sapnap, and GeorgeNotFound
 Dream Team (comics), a fictional group of Marvel Comics superheroes
 Mario & Luigi: Dream Team, a 2013 video game for the Nintendo 3DS
 A fictional basketball team led by Bill Russell appearing on the TV special Goin' Back to Indiana
 The Dream Team (professional wrestling), professional wrestling tag-team in the World Wrestling Federation 1985–1987
 Dramatic Dream Team, Japanese professional wrestling promotion

Law
 Dream Team (law), nickname for the legal defense team in the O. J. Simpson murder case

See also
 

Nicknamed groups of sportspeople
Nicknamed groups of racing drivers